Red UNO de Bolivia (occasionally also called simply UNO) is a national Bolivian television network.  It started operations in April 1984.  Its most notable programming is Notivision (news) and "El Mañanero (morning magazine)". It also maintains affiliation deals with three channels in Potosí, Sucre and Tarija.

History

Cruzeña de Television and Teleandina 
Cruceña de Televisión (Channel 13) was launched on the air on April 1, 1984 owned by Ivo Kuljis.

In the city of La Paz it began to broadcast on July 1, 1985, under the name of Teleandina through channel 11 (VHF), with broadcasts from Monday to Friday at 6:00 p.m. and on weekends at 5:00 p.m. Back then, filmmaker Hugo Roncal was the channel's general manager. In 1987 the transmitting antenna is changed and Teveandina expands its broadcast schedules starting at 11:00 a.m. from Monday to Friday and at 6:00 a.m. on Sundays. Teleandina's studio was located in the center of the city and they moved to Miraflores first and to Sopocachi at the end of the 1980s, thus broadcasting regularly since November 24, 1988.
Teleandina's first programs were Virgul, an animated cartoon; the America's Top 10; Julio Sabala specials and Italian Football on Sunday mornings.

Formation of Red Uno de Bolivia (1991)
In 1991, it entered a stage of definitive consolidation. His relationship with associated production companies allowed him to produce national programs.

Likewise, Teleandina broadcast on channels 11 from Oruro, 13 from Santa Cruz, 6 and later signal 9 from Cochabamba (channel 2 CCA Corazón de América is an independent channel that broadcast some programs), 11 from La Paz and had repeater stations. throughout the country.

In November 1994, a new stage of technological growth begins with a new transmission equipment adapted to work at an altitude of 4000 msnm and with a power of 5 kW.

Work was done on the ideal conditioning for the operation of this new equipment, which consisted of new irradiation antennas, a new tower and adequate electrical installations.

The work carried out made it possible to improve the quality of the signal, thus perfecting the sharpness of the image; and a greater reach allowing a wide national coverage.

In 2012, Uno inaugurated new studios located in Santa Cruz and the modernization of its equipment to be able to broadcast and record in HD. However, it was not until 2018 when the channel began broadcasting on digital terrestrial television (DTT) in high definition.

Red Uno begins to have a crisis in 2015 and caused by a labor award, in August 2020, the ordinary justice freezes the accounts of Red Uno (valued at a value of more than Bs 2,000,000); the channel suffers several layoffs and the crisis of its programming. The problem is (even today) that there is sufficient evidence of labor abuse that still happens in that company. This fact was covered up by the previous government and only the Ordinary Justice of Santa Cruz has responded by freezing accounts.

Studios
Red Uno has its studios 1 and 2 in the second northern ring road of Santa Cruz. They are accessed by Cristóbal de Mendoza esq. Honduras, very close to there at Fortín Toledo Esquina Canada, has its studios 3 and 4. In August 2019, it opened its "El Bajio" unit in the sixth ring road of Pirai Avenue with the largest television studio in Bolivia, its studio 5, approximately one thousand square meters. It also has central control, in addition to studies in La Paz and Cochabamba.

 Cristóbal de Mendoza Fortín Toledo and Av. Pirai, Santa Cruz (5 studios, 8 sets): Notivisión Santa Cruz, Bigote, Que no me pierda Santa Cruz, El mañanero Santa Cruz, Cocineros bolivianos Santa Cruz, Factor X and Los Marquina. Regional administrative offices.
 Romecín Campos 592, La Paz (4 sets): Notivisión La Paz, Que no me pierda La Paz, El mañanero La Paz and Cocineros bolivianos La Paz. Center check. Satellite Teleport.
 Uyuni 1029, Cochabamba (2 studios): Notivisión Cochabamba and El mañanero Cochabamba''.
 There is also a broadcast in Sucre and Tarija given by the "Grupo de Comunicaciones del Sur" for the channel and for Radio Panamericana.

Programming
Its programming until its crisis is still notable for telenovelas from TV Globo (Brazil), Caracol (Colombia), Latin Media Corporation (India). Even between 2011 and 2017, productions of Televisa and South Korean soap operas stood out. Televisa went to Bolivisión after the meager results and the South Korean telenovelas would be displaced by the Turkish ones. In this genre, it aired telenovelas on Show TV and Kanal D, also with regular results. What characterized the channel as an alternative to Unitel and ATB, were more realities and the mixture of its own programs, classic CBS series and even fiction. and national TV shows(such as the former ¡Qué familiaǃ Los Serrano for example).

Original Programming 
 Notivisión: Newscast of the channel.
 El mañanero: Morning magazine, informative format.
 Sabores Bolivianos: Original version of Cocineros argentinos, a program dedicated to cooking.
 Qué No Me Pierda: Late night show, focused on being an informative one.

Announcers 
 Jesus Rodriguez (2008-2020)
 Veronica Sejas Zamorano (2019–present)

Slogans 

 2013-2014: Somos alegría, somos uno (We are joy, we are one)
 2014-2015: El canal de la alegría (The Channel of Joy)
 2016-2019: La alegría es naranja (Joy is orange)
 2018–2022: Cada vez mejor (Getting better and better)
 2022–present: Para todos (For everyone)

Controversy

Government Propaganda 
The then Minister of Communication (ministry currently dissolved), Isabel Fernández Suárez revealed that the television media in Bolivia enjoyed benefits of millions of dollars of government propaganda in the previous administration of government, of which Red Uno received an amount of 82.3 million Bolivians between the years 2017, 2018 and 2019.

References

External links
www.reduno.com.bo

Television in Bolivia
Mass media in La Paz